A discography of albums released by the ECM Records label. ECM New Series albums are denoted by NS added to the catalogue number. Distributor catalogue numbers are not provided here.

ECM 1001 –

ECM 1201 –

ECM 1401 –

ECM 1600 –

ECM 1800 –

ECM 2000 –

ECM 2201 –

ECM 2401 –

ECM 2601 –

:rarum

Works

References 

 *
ECM Records albums